Herbert Harold Hamilton (27 March 1906–1951) was an English footballer who played in the Football League for Accrington Stanley, Chesterfield, Everton, New Brighton, Preston North End and Tranmere Rovers.

References

1906 births
1951 deaths
English footballers
Association football defenders
English Football League players
New Brighton A.F.C. players
Everton F.C. players
Preston North End F.C. players
Chesterfield F.C. players
Tranmere Rovers F.C. players
Accrington Stanley F.C. (1891) players
Bangor City F.C. players
Marine F.C. players